Null House is a historic home located at Baltimore, Maryland, United States. It is a -story, three-bay wide dwelling of wood-frame construction that was built between 1782 and 1784. It is a rare specimen of the early wooden clapboard building. The façade features a one-story wooden Italianate storefront of later construction with large store windows and two entrances. Originally located at 1010 Hillen Street, to save the building from demolition, it was moved on September 28, 1980, to the present site, 300 feet northeast of its original location on the opposite side of Hillen Street.

Null House was listed on the National Register of Historic Places on January 27, 1983.

Gallery

References

External links
, including photo from 1980, at Maryland Historical Trust
 Null House at Explore Baltimore Heritage

Houses on the National Register of Historic Places in Baltimore
Houses in Baltimore
Houses completed in 1782
Italianate architecture in Maryland
Old Town, Baltimore
1782 establishments in Maryland